Rob Dixon is an American jazz saxophonist.

A native of Atlanta, Dixon went to Indiana University where he came under the influence of the renowned jazz educator David Baker. After moving to New York in 1996, he began gigging around town with other up-and-coming musicians like drummer Ari Hoenig, organist Greg Lewis and pianist Rick Germanson, and vocalist Cynthia Layne. He subsequently worked in Illinois Jacquet's big band for four years before following tenor saxophonist Mark Turner in Tana Reid, a straight-ahead quartet co-led by drummer Akira Tana and bassist Rufus Reid.

After several years away, Dixon returned to Indianapolis in 2003, where he worked with a number of organizations, such as the Cleveland Heritage Jazz Orchestra and the Buselli-Wallarab Jazz Orchestra. In addition to working with these bands, he leads a jazz-funk group called  and an organ quartet with veteran organ player Melvin Rhyne.

Dixon is signed with Owl Studios, an Indianapolis-based jazz label. He has released two albums on the label as a bandleader: What Things Could Be (2006) and Reinvention: The Dixon-Rhyne Project (2008). On the latter album, Dixon collaborates with legendary jazz organist Melvin Rhyne, known for playing with, among others, Wes Montgomery and T-Bone Walker.

In addition, Dixon is often featured as a sideman with other Owl Studios recording artists, including Derrick Gardner & the Jazz Prophets, the Buselli-Wallarab Jazz Orchestra, Cynthia Layne, Steve Allee, Mike Clark, and The Headhunters. His composition (with Raeford Gerald) Bump'n from the Middle is on the compilation Act 1 on Southbound, Ace Records (UK).

Dixon also directs the Indianapolis Chamber Orchestra Youth Jazz Ensemble. .

Discography

References

African-American saxophonists
American jazz bandleaders
American jazz composers
American male jazz composers
American jazz saxophonists
American male saxophonists
Owl Studios artists
Musicians from Atlanta
Year of birth missing (living people)
Musicians from New York (state)
Living people
21st-century American saxophonists
21st-century American male musicians
The Dixon-Rhyne Project members
21st-century African-American musicians